The Warren Spahn Award is presented each season by the Oklahoma Sports Museum to the best left-handed pitcher in Major League Baseball (MLB). The award is named after Warren Spahn, who holds the MLB record in wins for a left-handed pitcher with 363. The Warren Spahn Award was created in 1999 by Richard Hendricks, the founder of the Oklahoma Sports Museum, to honor Spahn, who resided in Oklahoma. The award was presented at the Masonic Temple in Guthrie, Oklahoma until 2009, when the Bricktown Rotary Club became a sponsor of the award. Since 2009, the award is presented at the annual Warren Spahn Award Gala, hosted by the Bricktown Rotary Club of Oklahoma City at the Jim Thorpe Museum every January.

The award has been won by 14 different pitchers. The winner is chosen based on rankings, which are based on wins, strikeouts and earned run average. The most recent recipient is Julio Urías of the Los Angeles Dodgers.  Randy Johnson received the first four awards from 1999 through 2002. He attended the awards ceremony due to his respect for Spahn, who called him personally to ask him to attend. CC Sabathia (2007–2009), Johan Santana (2004, 2006) and Clayton Kershaw (2011, 2013, 2014, 2017) are also multiple Warren Spahn Award winners. Johnson (1999–2002), Santana (2004, 2006), Sabathia (2007) and Kershaw (2011, 2013, 2014) also won the Cy Young Award, given annually to the best pitcher in each league, in years they won the Warren Spahn Award. 
Santana (2004, 2006), Sabathia (2007), Kershaw (2011, 2013, 2014) and Keuchel (2015) won the Pitcher of the Year Award, given annually to the most outstanding pitcher in each league, in years they won the Warren Spahn Award.

There has been one tie-break in the Warren Spahn Award's history, which occurred when Sabathia defeated the Houston Astros' Wandy Rodríguez to earn his third consecutive award in 2009. The tie-break was decided based on winning percentage.

Winners

See also

Baseball awards

References

External links
The Warren Spahn Award

Major League Baseball trophies and awards

Awards established in 1999
1999 establishments in Oklahoma
Handedness in baseball